The South African springhare (Pedetes capensis) is a medium-sized terrestrial and burrowing rodent. Despite the name, it is not a hare. It is one of two extant species in the genus Pedetes, and is native to southern Africa. Formerly, the genus was considered monotypic and the East African springhare (P. surdaster) was included in P. capensis.

Springhares live throughout semi-arid areas in southern Africa, preferentially in sandy plains and pans with short grasses. In agricultural areas, springhares can be considered a pest due to their destructive feeding on crops. However, they are not currently considered under an impending risk of extinction.

Characteristics 

The springhare resembles a small kangaroo with well-developed hind legs, short front legs, and a long tail which comprises half of its body length. As well as a long tail, springhares have relatively large eyes and ears. Similar to kangaroos, they are also saltatorial animals who use their tails for balance.

Springhares have long, soft fur, which shortens around the legs, heads, and ears. The colour of this mammal varies from a reddish-brown on its upperparts to an off-white belly and a black tip on the tail. Sometimes the ear tips are also black. Young springhares have finer and fluffier fur and usually have black patches of fur under their hind feet and in a patch of black under their tail base.

Springhares have a different number of toes on their forelegs and hindlegs. Their short forelegs have five digits, each ending in a long, sharp, curved claw, which can be 16 millimetres long. their long hindlegs have four digits, three of which are visibly developed and equipped with a strong triangular nail.

The oldest recorded individual was 88 months (7 years and 4 months) old.

Biofluorescence 
Springhare fur is biofluorescent. Their biofluorescence is patchy, with areas important to grooming and intra-specific interactions being the most biofluorescent. Little is known about its biofluorescence, but both species of springhare are the first thoroughly documented cases of biofluorescence in an Old World eutherian mammal.

Regeneration 
In a study of ear regeneration in mammals, springhares were found to have the capacity for minimal ear tissue regeneration. This regeneration is far behind to that of rabbits.

Ecology and behaviour 
Springhares are nocturnal animals, who forage during the night and retreat to a burrow during the day. While sleeping in their burrows, springhares sleep standing, with their head and forelimbs bent down in between their hindlegs, and their tail wrapped around their feet.

These animals are predated upon by a variety of predators, including humans; at least 21 species prey on springhares in the Kalahari.

Burrowing 
Springhares are burrowing animals. They dig their own burrows on well-drained sandy soils, preferentially during the wet season.

Burrows are often located near trees or shrubs, which are sparse in the typical springhare habitat. It is thought they may help with concealment as well as providing a point of reference back to the burrow. A springhare's burrow is 20 cm in diameter, may be up to 1 meter deep and up to 7 meters long. Burrows may  cover an area of  up to 170 m2. They usually have several entrances. Two types of entrances can be distinguished, one which is very visible thanks to the pile of sand present at the opening, and the other one which is a "hidden" entrance with no soil to mark its presence.

Springhares remain close to one of their burrow entrances while feeding and if disturbed, they return to their own burrows, ignoring other burrows in the way. Radio-tracked springhares used burrows in areas covering 0.6 to 28.5 ha.

Springhares tend to only reside in any given burrow for a few consecutive days at most.  In a study of their burrowing activities in South Africa, they found that springhares used 4 to 27 different burrows, and most burrows (70%) were only ever used by a single springhare. Very few burrows were used by more than two animals. In the same study, they found cohabitation (two springhares using the same burrow at the same time) to be very rare. The same burrows may be used throughout generations and expanded, with new tunnels added as needed. While springhares have not been seen defending their burrows or territory, they mark the burrows with their perineal glands secretions, or by urinating at the burrow entrance, probably to warn other springhares that a specific burrow is occupied.

Springhares are able to plug entrances to their burrows with soil. Two plug types were distinguished. Temporary plugs formed from the inside of the burrow, probably aimed at avoiding predators entering a burrow. Permanent plugs were long (0.5 – 3 m) and sometimes filled entire tunnel branches.

The springhare's unoccupied burrows are sometimes used for hiding during the daytime by a number of other species, including the black-footed cat and the ground pangolin.

Feeding and foraging 
Springhares are herbivorous, eating a variety of plant matter, such as roots, stems, leaves, and seeds. However, springhares are picky eaters and often leave abundant plant materials behind in their feeding grounds. On occasion, springhares may feed on insects such as beetles or locusts, or even carrion.

Springhares feed at night and can range 150 – 400 m away of one of their burrows. They may feed in large groups of up to nine individuals. In these instances, they do not display aggression or territorial behaviours.

Reproduction 
Springhares breed throughout the year and have a gestation period of about 77 days. The females give birth to a single young about three times a year. Moreover, females can be lactating and in the early stages of pregnancy at the same time.

Their ability to reproduce year-round is thought to be attributable to their highly selective diet (choosing only the best parts of the plant), their wide range of foods available to them (above and underground), and their behavioural and physical adaptations to living in arid and semi-arid conditions.

Springhares give birth in a burrow to a furred young of about 250 - 300 g. Springhares usually give birth to a single young, but birthing twins is known to occur. While the young remains at the burrow, the mother stops the usual behaviour of moving burrows every couple of days. She is bound to the burrow where her young is, who depends entirely on her milk. The young stays in the burrow for approximately seven weeks until they attain a body weight of approximately 1.3 kg.  The extended period of parental care may help mitigate a birthrate that is, among rodents, remarkably low.

Traditional human uses 
San and baTswana people both traditionally make use of springhares. Both groups of people hunt springhares, which can yield up to 1360 g (3 lb.) of meat.  Aside from the meat, San people use springhare skins for a variety of uses, such as bags, mats, karosses (garments or blankets made from sewn animal skins) and hats. The tail provides sinew for sewing and an ornamental belt which produces sounds can be made by tying springhare toes on a string.

Gallery

References

External links 

Further Information at Animal Diversity Web

South African springhare
Mammals of Zambia
Mammals of Zimbabwe
Mammals of Southern Africa
Extant Zanclean first appearances
South African springhare

fr:Lièvre sauteur